Colusa is an unincorporated community in Dallas City Township, Hancock County, Illinois, United States. Colusa has a post office with ZIP code 62329.

Education
Nauvoo-Colusa Community Unit School District 325 operates public elementary and junior high schools serving the community.

Prior to 2008 residents attended Nauvoo-Colusa High School. Since 2008 residents have attended Warsaw Community Unit School District 316's Warsaw High School.

References

Unincorporated communities in Hancock County, Illinois
Unincorporated communities in Illinois